Weronika Murek (born 1989) is a Polish playwright, short story writer and essayist.

Early life and education 
Weronika Murek was born in 1989, in Bytom. She graduated from the Faculty of Law and Administration of the University of Silesia.

Career 
Murek has written plays, short stories and essays. She won the Gdynia Drama Award 2015 for the play Feinweinblein set in the 1950s Upper Silesia. Her debut collection of short stories Uprawa roślin południowych metodą Miczurina was nominated for the Paszport Polityki 2015 in the literature category, the Nike Award 2016, the Gdynia Literary Prize 2016 and the Conrad Award 2016. The collection won the Witold Gombrowicz literary award in 2016. Murek gained her second Paszport Polityki nomination with the 2019 collection of plays called Feinweinblein.

Apart from writing her own plays, Murek has also worked on adaptating the work of others to the stage. For example, she cooperated with Grzegorz Jarzyna to adapt a work by Lu Xun or create together a new production of The Tempest.

Murek's works have been translated into Czech, French, Serbian and Hungarian. An excerpt from her short story collection was published in English on the European Literature Network website.

Works 

 Uprawa roślin południowych metodą Miczurina, 2015
 Każdemu po razie, short story for O_KA literary project, 2016
 Feinweinblein, 2019
 Dziewczynki: kilka esejów o stawaniu się, 2023

References 

1989 births
Living people
21st-century Polish dramatists and playwrights
21st-century Polish women writers
People from Bytom
Polish women short story writers
21st-century short story writers